Events from the year 1745 in Sweden

Incumbents
 Monarch – Frederick I

Events

 
 
 Catharina Ebba Horn becomes the official royal mistress of the King.
 Hortus Upsaliensis by Carl von Linné 
 - Defense treaty between Sweden and Russia.

Births

 
 February 21 - Olof Tempelman, architect  (died 1816) 
 March 5 - Christina Elisabeth Carowsky, painter  (died 1797)
 May 5 - Carl August Ehrensvärd, naval officer, painter, author, and neo-classical architect  (died 1800)
 August 19 - Johan Gottlieb Gahn, chemist and metallurgist who discovered manganese  (died 1817)
 September 12 - Lovisa Meijerfeldt, countess and courtier, known as one of the "Three Graces" (died 1818)
 - Brita Horn, courtier  (died 1791)

Deaths

 
 
 
 - Hedvig Catharina Lillie, politically active salonniere  (born  1695)
 - Sarah Derith, politically active noblewoman  (born 1680)

References

 
Years of the 18th century in Sweden
Sweden